Piz Calderas is a mountain of the Noah Elie (NONO), overlooking Mulegns in the canton of Graubünden. It is the highest summit of the group located between the Julier and Albula Pass. On its east side lies the Val Bever.

See also
List of mountains of Graubünden
List of most isolated mountains of Switzerland

References

External links

 Piz Calderas on Summitpost
 Piz Calderas on Hikr

Mountains of Switzerland
Mountains of Graubünden
Mountains of the Alps
Alpine three-thousanders
Surses
Bever, Switzerland